Matloob is an Urdu given name and surname. Notable people with the name include:

Matloob Inkalabi, Pakistani politician
Nawabzada Raja Matloob Mehdi, Pakistani politician
Samina Matloob, Pakistani politician

Urdu-language surnames
Urdu given names